Pratique du théâtre (English:Theater Practice) is a 1657 book on the theatre by the French author François Hédelin, abbé d'Aubignac. Cardinal Richelieu had consulted him for ideas on unified standards for French stage productions. As Marvin Carlson noted in the introduction to a translation, "D’Aubignac, who hoped to become the first director of a national theatre, drew up recommendations on architecture, scenery, stage morality, seating, and control of audiences". Richelieu exhorted him to draw up a baseline for the French theatre, a "guidebook for would-be dramatists". The work did become the standard for actors, directors, and producers of the stage in France for much time to come. Some of his guidelines include the need for credibility (vraisemblance), economy in the size of the cast, and the absence of scene or character shifts.

References

1657 books